The Dallas Cowboys are professional American football team based in Dallas, Texas.  The Cowboys team is a franchise of the National Football League (NFL) and plays in the East Division of the National Football Conference.  The first draft in which the Cowboys participated was the 1961 NFL Draft. Before their initial NFL Draft, the Cowboys franchise participated in the 1960 NFL Expansion Draft. In the NFL Draft, each NFL franchise annually adds new players to its roster.  Teams are ranked in reverse order based on their records during the previous season, therefore the team with the worst record selects first.  There are two exceptions to this order:  the Super Bowl champion from the previous season selects last, and the Super Bowl runner-up selects second to last.  Teams have the option of trading away their selections to other teams for different selections, players, cash, or any combination thereof.  It is common, therefore, for the actual draft selection of a team to differ from their initial assigned draft selection or for a team to have either extra selections or no selections in any round because of such trades.

Key

Player selections

Footnotes
 Players are identified as a Hall of Famer if they have been inducted into the Pro Football Hall of Fame.
 Players are identified as a Pro Bowler if they were selected for the Pro Bowl at any time in their career.
 The Cowboys took Lilly with their second first-round selection.  Their first selection, the second overall, was traded to the Washington Redskins for Eddie LeBaron.
 The Cowboys traded their first selection in 1962 to the Cleveland Browns for Offensive Tackle Paul Dickson and the Browns' first selection in 1961.
 Scott Appleton signed with the Houston Oilers of the American Football League.
 The Cowboys traded their selection to the Houston Oilers for the rights to linebacker George Webster.
 The Cowboys received this selection from the New England Patriots in exchange for Ron Francis, David Howard, Eugene Lockhart, a first-round and a second-round pick.
 The Cowboys received this selection and a fifth-round pick from the Washington Redskins in exchange for an earlier first-round pick.
 The Cowboys traded this first-round selection (22nd overall) to the Buffalo Bills for Bills' second-round selection (43rd overall), fifth-round selection (144th overall), and first-round selection in 2005.
 The Cowboys received this selection from the Buffalo Bills as well as the Bills' selections in 2004 in the second (43rd overall) and fifth rounds (144th overall) for the Cowboys' first-round selection in 2004 (22nd overall).
 Dallas traded their original first-round selection (22nd overall) to the Cleveland Browns for the Browns' first-round selection in 2008 and the Browns' second-round selection (36th overall) in this draft.  Dallas then traded that additional second-round selection (32nd overall), their third-round selection (87th overall), and their fifth-round selection (159th overall) to the Philadelphia Eagles for the Eagles' first-round selection (26th overall).
 The Cowboys received this selection from the Cleveland Browns as well as the Browns' second-round selection (36th overall) in 2007 for the Cowboys first-round selection in 2007 (22nd overall).
 Dallas received this selection from the Seattle Seahawks for Dallas' original first-round selection (28th overall) and Dallas' fifth- and seventh-round selections (163rd and 235th).
 The Cowboys traded their 20th overall pick (first round), the 82nd overall picks (third round), and 192nd overall pick (sixth round) in the 2009 draft for wide receiver Roy Williams from the Detroit Lions. The Cowboys received a seventh-round pick from the Lions in the 2010 draft.
 Dallas traded their original first-round and third-round selection (27th and 90th overall) to the New England Patriots for the Patriots' first-round selection and a fourth-round selection in 2010 to select Dez Bryant over the Baltimore Ravens.
 Dallas traded their original first-round pick (18th overall) to the San Francisco 49ers for the 49ers' first and third-round selections

References

  
  
 
 
 
 
 
  
 

Dallas Cowboys

first-round draft picks